HMS Thistle (N24) was a T-class submarine of the Royal Navy. She was laid down by Vickers Armstrong, Barrow and launched in October 1938. She was sunk by the German submarine  on 10 April 1940 near Skudenes.

Career
At the onset of the Second World War, Thistle was a member of the 2nd Submarine Flotilla. From 26 to 29 August 1939, the flotilla deployed to its war bases at Dundee and Blyth.

Thistle, under the command of Lt. Wilfrid Frederick Haselfoot, was ordered to patrol off Stavanger, and to sink any enemy vessel that she might spot in the harbour, since British authorities believed that a German invasion of Norway was imminent. On 10 April, Thistle signaled her intention to comply with this order and that she had two torpedoes remaining after an unsuccessful attack on a U-boat. With this in mind the Admiralty changed her orders to patrol off Skudenes. No further contact was made with Thistle.

Sinking
It was later discovered that , the U-boat Thistle had previously attacked, had sighted the submarine on the surface and sunk her with torpedoes.

The action began when HMS Thistle spotted U-4 cruising on the surface with a periscope. At 16.04 hours on 9 April 1940 HMS Thistle fired a spread of six torpedoes, all of which missed. HMS Thistle later reported the unsuccessful engagement via radio, and that the submarine had only two torpedoes left.

U-4 observed one torpedo passing ten meters ahead and evaded further underwater attacks by crash diving. The U-boat crew later heard three explosions of the 
off-track torpedoes at the end of their run. Afterwards U-4 found HMS Thistle on the surface recharging its batteries.

At 02.13 hours on the morning of 10 April 1940, U-4 fired a spread of two torpedoes at its attacker. The first, a G7a torpedo, missed. The second, a magnetic G7e torpedo, found its mark, sinking Thistle with all hands near Skudenes.

Notes

References
 
  
 
 
 
 
 

 

British T-class submarines of the Royal Navy
Ships built in Barrow-in-Furness
1938 ships
World War II submarines of the United Kingdom
Lost submarines of the United Kingdom
Ships sunk by German submarines in World War II
World War II shipwrecks in the Norwegian Sea
Maritime incidents in April 1940
Ships lost with all hands
Submarines sunk by submarines